Jimmy Dykes (born May 3, 1961) is a former American college basketball coach and current sportscaster for ESPN and SEC Network. He was the women's basketball head coach at the University of Arkansas until resigning in March 2017.

Before making the transition to working for ESPN the first time, Dykes served as a men's assistant basketball coach at University of Arkansas, Appalachian State University, University of Kentucky, Arkansas State University, University of Arkansas at Little Rock, and Oklahoma State University. He has also served as a scout for the NBA's Seattle SuperSonics. Dykes also served as Shiloh Christian School's (located in Springdale, Arkansas) Director of Athletics in 2006.

Head coaching career

Arkansas (2014–17)

Jimmy Dykes was announced as the new head coach of the University of Arkansas women's basketball team on March 30, 2014. Dykes replaced Tom Collen as the women's head coach at Arkansas after Collen was fired at the end of the 2013–2014 season.

In his first year at Arkansas, Dykes led his team of nine players to the NCAA tournament after finishing in the middle of the pack of the SEC. His Razorbacks defeated 7 seed Northwestern before falling to second seeded Baylor in the second round.

Dykes' second year saw the team finish 10th in the SEC and with a losing record overall, at 12–18. His third team finished last in the conference, winning only two league games.

Personal life
Dykes is a 1985 graduate of the University of Arkansas, where he played basketball for the Razorbacks and former head coach Eddie Sutton.

Dykes currently resides in Johnson, Arkansas.  He is married to Tiffany Beasley, a former Razorback cheerleader. The two have one daughter, Kennedy, born in 2005. Dykes is a Christian.

Jimmy lived in Nashville early in his career for 9 months while pursuing a career in country music.

Head coaching record

References

External links
 Arkansas profile

1961 births
Living people
American basketball scouts
American men's basketball players
American television sports announcers
American women's basketball coaches
Appalachian State Mountaineers men's basketball coaches
Arkansas Razorbacks men's basketball players
Arkansas Razorbacks women's basketball coaches
Arkansas State Red Wolves men's basketball coaches
College basketball announcers in the United States
College football announcers
Kentucky Wildcats men's basketball coaches
Oklahoma State Cowboys basketball coaches
Seattle SuperSonics scouts
Sportspeople from Tulsa, Oklahoma